The Bernoulli polynomials of the second kind , also known as the Fontana-Bessel polynomials, are the polynomials defined by the following generating function:

 

The first five polynomials are:

Some authors define these polynomials slightly differently

 

so that

and may also use a different notation for them (the most used alternative notation is ).

The Bernoulli polynomials of the second kind were largely studied by the Hungarian mathematician Charles Jordan, but their history may also be traced back to the much earlier works.

Integral representations
The Bernoulli polynomials of the second kind may be represented via these integrals

 

as well as

These polynomials are, therefore, up to a constant, the antiderivative of the binomial coefficient and also that of the falling factorial.

Explicit formula
For an arbitrary , these polynomials may be computed explicitly via the following summation formula

Recurrence formula
The Bernoulli polynomials of the second kind satisfy the recurrence relation

or equivalently

The repeated difference produces

Symmetry property
The main property of the symmetry reads

Some further properties and particular values
Some properties and particular values of these polynomials include 

Expansion into a Newton series
The expansion of the Bernoulli polynomials of the second kind into a Newton series reads

Some series involving the Bernoulli polynomials of the second kind
The digamma function  may be expanded into a series with the Bernoulli polynomials of the second kind
in the following way

and hence

and

where  is Euler's constant. Furthermore, we also have

 

where  is the gamma function. The Hurwitz and Riemann zeta functions may be expanded into these
polynomials as follows

 

and

 

and also

 

The Bernoulli polynomials of the second kind are also involved in the following relationship

 

between the zeta functions, as well as in various formulas for the Stieltjes constants, e.g.

 

and

 

See also
 Bernoulli polynomials
 Stirling polynomials
 Gregory coefficients
 Bernoulli numbers
 Difference polynomials
 Poly-Bernoulli number
 Mittag-Leffler polynomials

References

Mathematics 

Polynomials
Number theory